Stephen Elliot Dunn (June 24, 1939June 24, 2021) was an American poet and educator who authored twenty-one collections of poetry.  He won the Pulitzer Prize for Poetry for his 2001 collection, Different Hours, and received an Academy Award in Literature from the American Academy of Arts and Letters. He also won three National Endowment for the Arts Creative Writing Fellowships, Guggenheim Fellowship, and Rockefeller Foundations Fellowship.

Early life
Dunn was born in Forest Hills, Queens, New York on June 24, 1939. His parents were Ellen (Fleishman) and Charles Dunn.  He attended Forest Hills High School, where he played basketball.  After graduating in 1957, he studied history at Hofstra University.  He played guard for its basketball team and was part of the squad that had a 23–1 record during the 1959–60 season.  He was nicknamed "Radar" for his ability to make jump shots.

Dunn graduated from Hofstra University in 1962 and went on to play one season for the Williamsport Billies of the Eastern Basketball Association. He then worked in advertising until he was 26, when he traveled to Spain to pen a novel, which he ended up discarding.  He subsequently undertook postgraduate studies at Syracuse University, obtaining a master's degree in creative writing in 1970.

Career
Dunn began teaching at Stockton University in 1974 and published his first full-length collection entitled Looking for Holes in the Ceiling that same year.  He continued working at Stockton for approximately three decades, and also taught at Wichita State University, University of Washington, Columbia University, University of Michigan, and Princeton University.

A collection of essays about Dunn's poetry was published in 2013.  He finished his last book, The Not Yet Fallen World, shortly before his death.  It is scheduled to be published in May 2022, and was viewed by Dunn as the best work he had written.

Personal life
Dunn married his first wife, Lois Kelly, in 1964.  Together, they had two children: Susanne and Andrea.  They divorced in 2001.  He married Barbara Hurd the following year.

Dunn had earlier lived in Port Republic, New Jersey.  He later resided at homes in Ocean City, New Jersey, as well as Hurd's hometown of Frostburg, Maryland.  He died on the night of his 82nd birthday at his home in Frostburg.  He suffered from Parkinson’s disease prior to his death.

Selected bibliography

Poetry

Collections

Full of Lust and Good Usage, Carnegie-Mellon University Press (Pittsburgh, PA), 1976.  
A Circus of Needs, Carnegie-Mellon University Press (Pittsburgh, PA), 1978. 
Work and Love, Carnegie-Mellon University Press (Pittsburgh, PA), 1981. 
Not Dancing, Carnegie-Mellon University Press (Pittsburgh, PA), 1984.  
Local Time, Quill/Morrow (New York, NY), 1986. 
Between Angels: Poems, W. W. Norton & Company (New York, NY), 1989. 
Landscape at the End of the Century: Poems, W. W. Norton & Company (New York, NY), 1991. 
New and Selected Poems: 1974-1994, W. W. Norton & Company (New York, NY), 1994. 
Loosestrife: Poems, W. W. Norton & Company (New York, NY), 1996. 
Riffs & Reciprocities: Prose Pairs, W. W. Norton & Company (New York, NY), 1998. 
Different Hours, W. W. Norton & Company (New York, NY), 2000.  
The Insistence of Beauty: Poems, W. W. Norton & Company (New York, NY), 2004.  
Local Visitations: Poems, Norton, 2004,  
Everything Else in the World, W. W. Norton & Company (New York, NY), 2006. 
What Goes On: Selected and New Poems 1995-2009, W. W. Norton (New York, NY), 2009. 
Here and Now: Poems, W. W. Norton & Company (New York, NY), 2011. 
Lines of Defense, W. W. Norton & Company (New York, NY), 2014. 
Whereas: Poems, W. W. Norton & Company (New York, NY), 2017. 
Pagan Virtues: Poems, W. W. Norton & Company (New York, NY), 2019. ISBN 978-1324002314
The Not Yet Fallen World: New and Selected Poems.  W. W. Norton & Company (New York, NY), 2022. ISBN 978-0-393-88225-4.

Selected list of poems

Non fiction
Walking Light: Memoirs and Essays on Poetry, BOA Editions, Ltd., 2001. 

Degrees of Fidelity: Essays on Poetry and the Latitudes of the Personal, Tiger Bark Press, 2018.

References

External links

Interview with Stephen Dunn for The Cortland Review. 
Author Interview in The Commonline Journal, #011
Author interview for Guernica Magazine (Guernicamag.com)
Article on Dunn winning the 2001 Pulitzer Prize
"The Lost Thing" - a poem by Stephen Dunn
Stephen Dunn biography
 Audio: Stephen Dunn reads "Talk to God" from the book What Goes On (via poemsoutloud.net)

1939 births
2021 deaths
American male poets
Columbia University faculty
Neurological disease deaths in Maryland
Deaths from Parkinson's disease
Hofstra University alumni
People from Frostburg, Maryland
People from Atlantic County, New Jersey
Pulitzer Prize for Poetry winners
Stockton University faculty
Syracuse University College of Arts and Sciences alumni
University of Michigan faculty
People from Ocean City, New Jersey
The New Yorker people
Williamsport Billies (basketball) players
Hofstra Pride men's basketball players